In mathematics, the interval chromatic number X<(H) of an ordered graph H is the minimum number of intervals the (linearly ordered) vertex set of H can be partitioned into so that no two vertices belonging to the same interval are adjacent in H.

Difference with chromatic number 

It is interesting about interval chromatic number that it is easily computable.  Indeed, by a simple greedy algorithm one can efficiently find an optimal partition of the vertex set of H into X<(H) independent intervals.  This is in sharp contrast with the fact that even the approximation of the usual chromatic number of graph is an NP hard task.

Let K(H) is the chromatic number of any ordered graph H. Then for any ordered graph H,
X<(H) ≥ K(H).

One thing to be noted, for a particular graph H and its isomorphic graphs the chromatic number is same, but the interval chromatic number may differ. Actually it depends upon the ordering of the vertex set.

References

Graph coloring